The Loew Lake Unit of the Kettle Moraine State Forest is a  member of the Wisconsin state park system.  The unit offers hiking, hunting, and horse riding along the east branch of the Oconomowoc River and the shore of  Loew Lake, and also features a number of large conifer plantations.  A section of the Ice Age National Scenic Trail runs through the park as it follows the Kettle Moraine.

Protected areas of Washington County, Wisconsin
Kettle Moraine State Forest
Protected areas established in 1987
1987 establishments in Wisconsin